Kassala Airport  is an airport serving Kassala,  the capital city of the state of Kassala in Sudan.

Facilities

Airlines and destinations

References

External links
 

Airports in Sudan
Kassala (state)